Tietea singularis was a Marattialean tree fern from the Late Carboniferous to Permian which grew up to  in height. It is estimated to represent close to 90% of some fossil assemblages in Brazil.

The stem is surrounded by a continuous ring of sclerenchyma that separates it from the root mantle. T. singularis stem transverse sections have the same basic structure as Psaronius, but are composed of central vascular bundles having smaller, O- and C-shaped forms, or wavy segments having a short, rounded or fat configuration. Leaf traces are polymeristelic in Tietea, while they are monomeristelic in Psaronius. The Tietea root mantle is composed of polyarch roots embedded in a parenchymatous tissue that is produced both by the stem and the roots.

The preserved examples from Pedra do Fogo Formation, in the Maranhão Basin (northeastern Brazil, near Araguaína) exhibit remarkable cell preservation and exquisite coloration. Much of the recovered wood material from this formation is of the tree ferns Psaronius and T. singularis, with fewer examples of the fossilized stems being of Calamites. Conifers such as Dadoxylon are also found.

Tietea singularis is also seen abundantly in the Motuca Formation, Parnaíba Basin in Filadélfia, Tocantins. In 2000, the área of the Motuca formation was transformed into a Natural monument, the Monumento Natural das Árvores Fossilizadas-MONAF (Tocantins Fossil Trees Natural Monument).

References 

Marattiidae
Prehistoric plants of South America
Carboniferous Brazil
Permian Brazil
Fossils of Brazil
Paraná Basin